Tindo is a sub-prefecture in Guinea.  Its population is 5,052 according to 2014 census.

References 

Sub-prefectures of the Faranah Region